Apure may refer to:

In Venezuela
 Apure Province (1830 to 1864)
 Apure State
 Alto Apure District
 Apure River
 San Fernando de Apure, a city

In Gran Colombia
 Apure Province (17 July 1823 - 1864)
 Apure Department (1824-1830)
 La Campaña de Apure